I Gede Sukadana Pratama was born in October 18, 1987, he is an Indonesian professional footballer who plays as a midfielder for Liga 2 club Gresik United.

International career 
He made his debut with Indonesia on 25 March 2015 in a friendly against Cameroon.

Honours

Club
Persela Lamongan
 Piala Gubernur Jatim (2): 2009, 2010
Arema Cronus
 Piala Gubernur Jatim: 2013
 Menpora Cup: 2013
 Indonesian Inter Island Cup: 2014/15

References

External links
 I Gede Sukadana at Soccerway
 I Gede Sukadana at Liga Indonesia

1987 births
Association football midfielders
Living people
Balinese people
Indonesian Hindus
Indonesian footballers
Balinese sportspeople
Liga 1 (Indonesia) players
Persela Lamongan players
People from Denpasar
Arema F.C. players
Bali United F.C. players
Sportspeople from Bali